Pavel Richter (born 5 December 1954, in Prague) is a Czech former professional ice hockey forward who played for the Czechoslovak national team. He won a silver medal at the 1984 Winter Olympics.

Richter played in the Czechoslovak First Ice Hockey League for TJ ČKD Sparta Praha and ASVŠ Dukla Trenčín between 1973 and 1985.

Career statistics

Regular season and playoffs

International

References

External links

1954 births
HK Dukla Trenčín players
EHC Kloten players
Ice hockey players at the 1984 Winter Olympics
ESV Kaufbeuren players
Living people
Medalists at the 1984 Winter Olympics
Olympic ice hockey players of Czechoslovakia
Olympic medalists in ice hockey
Olympic silver medalists for Czechoslovakia
Nürnberg Ice Tigers players
HC Sparta Praha players
Ice hockey people from Prague
1. EV Weiden players
Czechoslovak expatriate sportspeople in Switzerland
Czechoslovak expatriate sportspeople in Germany
Czechoslovak expatriate ice hockey people
Expatriate ice hockey players in Switzerland
Expatriate ice hockey players in Germany
Czechoslovak ice hockey forwards
Czech ice hockey forwards
Czechoslovakia (WHA) players